Suvorov may refer to:

People
Alexander Suvorov (1729–1800), Russian general in service of the Russian Empire
Arkadi Suvorov (1784–1811), Russian general, son of Alexander Suvorov
Alexander Arkadyevich Suvorov (1804–1882), Russian general and diplomat, son of Arkady Suvorov
Aleksey Suvorov (born 1991), Russian speed-skater
Alexandru Suvorov (born 1987), Moldovan football player
Andrei Suvorov (1887–1917), Russian footballer
Georgii Suvorov (1919–1984), Soviet mathematician 
Igor Suvorov (born 1948), Russian banker
Maxim Suvorov (died 1770), director of the printing house of the Russian Synod
Nikolay Suvorov, Soviet commander of the Soviet submarine K-429 in 1983
Oleg Suvorov (born 1997), Russian footballer
Sergei Suvorov (1869–1918), Russian statistician, philosopher and revolutionary
Viktor Suvorov (born 1947), Russian writer and a former Soviet military intelligence officer

Places
Suvorov, Tula Oblast, Russia 
Suvorov (inhabited locality), several inhabited localities in Russia
Dumbrăveni, Vrancea, Romania, formerly known as Generalisimul Suvorov
Suwarrow, or Suvorov, in the Cook Islands
Suvorov Glacier, Antarctica

Ships
Aleksandr Suvorov (ship), a Russian/Soviet river cruise ship, launched 1981
Soviet cruiser Aleksandr Suvorov 1951–1990
Russian battleship Knyaz Suvorov, 1901–1905

Other uses
Suvorov (film), a 1941 Soviet film 
Suvorov Military School, a type of boarding school in the Soviet Union, Russia and Belarus
Suvorov military canals, in Finland 
2489 Suvorov, a minor planet

See also

Suvorovo (disambiguation)
Sergie Sovoroff (1901–1989), an Aleut educational leader
Yuri Suvarov, a fictional character in the 24 TV series
Order of Suvorov, a Soviet/Russian military decoration

Russian-language surnames